Hersilia, also known as long-spinnered bark spiders and two-tailed spiders, is a genus of tree trunk spiders that was first described by Jean Victoire Audouin in 1826. Their nicknames are a reference to their greatly enlarged spinnerets.

They are found in Africa, Asia, and Australasia, on tree trunks, in gardens, or in jungle fringes.

Species
The revisions by Baehr & Baehr and Rheims & Brescovit revealed 26 species in southeast Asia.

 it contains seventy-eight species:

H. albicomis Simon, 1887 – Ghana, Ivory Coast, Equatorial Guinea, Nigeria
H. albinota Baehr & Baehr, 1993 – China
H. albomaculata Wang & Yin, 1985 – China
H. aldabrensis Foord & Dippenaar-Schoeman, 2006 – Seychelles (Aldabra), Comoros
H. alluaudi Berland, 1920 – Congo, Tanzania
H. arborea Lawrence, 1928 – Namibia, Zimbabwe, South Africa
H. asiatica Song & Zheng, 1982 – China, Thailand, Laos, Taiwan
H. australiensis Baehr & Baehr, 1987 – Australia (Northern Territory)
H. baforti Benoit, 1967 – Congo, Uganda
H. baliensis Baehr & Baehr, 1993 – Laos, Bali
H. bifurcata Baehr & Baehr, 1998 – Australia (Northern Territory)
H. bubi Foord & Dippenaar-Schoeman, 2006 – Equatorial Guinea, Uganda
H. carobi Foord & Dippenaar-Schoeman, 2006 – Ivory Coast
H. caudata Audouin, 1826 (type) – Cape Verde Is., West Africa to China
H. clarki Benoit, 1967 – Zimbabwe
H. clypealis Baehr & Baehr, 1993 – Thailand
H. deelemanae Baehr & Baehr, 1993 – Indonesia (Sumatra)
H. eloetsensis Foord & Dippenaar-Schoeman, 2006 – Madagascar
H. facialis Baehr & Baehr, 1993 – Indonesia (Sumatra)
H. feai Baehr & Baehr, 1993 – Myanmar
H. flagellifera Baehr & Baehr, 1993 – Laos, Indonesia (Sumatra)
H. furcata Foord & Dippenaar-Schoeman, 2006 – Congo
H. hildebrandti Karsch, 1878 – Tanzania
H. igiti Foord & Dippenaar-Schoeman, 2006 – Rwanda
H. impressifrons Baehr & Baehr, 1993 – Borneo
H. incompta Benoit, 1971 – Ivory Coast
H. insulana Strand, 1907 – Madagascar
H. jajat Rheims & Brescovit, 2004 – Borneo
H. kerekot Rheims & Brescovit, 2004 – Borneo
H. kinabaluensis Baehr & Baehr, 1993 – Borneo
H. lelabah Rheims & Brescovit, 2004 – Borneo
H. longbottomi Baehr & Baehr, 1998 – Australia (Western Australia)
H. longivulva Sen, Saha & Raychaudhuri, 2010 – India
H. madagascariensis (Wunderlich, 2004) – Madagascar, Comoros
H. madang Baehr & Baehr, 1993 – New Guinea
H. mainae Baehr & Baehr, 1995 – Australia (Western Australia)
H. martensi Baehr & Baehr, 1993 – Nepal, Thailand
H. mboszi Foord & Dippenaar-Schoeman, 2006 – Cameroon, Ivory Coast
H. mimbi Baehr & Baehr, 1993 – Australia (Western Australia)
H. mjoebergi Baehr & Baehr, 1993 – Indonesia (Sumatra)
H. moheliensis Foord & Dippenaar-Schoeman, 2006 – Comoros
H. montana Chen, 2007 – Taiwan
H. mowomogbe Foord & Dippenaar-Schoeman, 2006 – Cameroon, Congo
H. nentwigi Baehr & Baehr, 1993 – Indonesia (Java, Sumatra, Krakatau)
H. nepalensis Baehr & Baehr, 1993 – Nepal
H. novaeguineae Baehr & Baehr, 1993 – New Guinea
H. occidentalis Simon, 1907 – West, Central, East Africa
H. okinawaensis Tanikawa, 1999 – Japan
H. orvakalensis Javed, Foord & Tampal, 2010 – India
H. pectinata Thorell, 1895 – Myanmar, Indonesia (Borneo), Philippines
H. pungwensis Tucker, 1920 – Zimbabwe
H. sagitta Foord & Dippenaar-Schoeman, 2006 – Kenya, Malawi, Tanzania, South Africa
H. savignyi Lucas, 1836 – Sri Lanka, India to Philippines
H. scrupulosa Foord & Dippenaar-Schoeman, 2006 – Kenya
H. selempoi Foord & Dippenaar-Schoeman, 2006 – Kenya
H. sericea Pocock, 1898 – East, Southern Africa
H. serrata Dankittipakul & Singtripop, 2011 – Thailand
H. setifrons Lawrence, 1928 – Angola, Namibia, South Africa
H. sigillata Benoit, 1967 – Gabon, Ivory Coast, Congo, Uganda
H. simplicipalpis Baehr & Baehr, 1993 – Thailand
H. striata Wang & Yin, 1985 – India, China, Myanmar, Thailand, Taiwan, Indonesia (Java, Sumatra)
H. sumatrana (Thorell, 1890) – India, Malaysia, Indonesia (Sumatra, Borneo)
H. sundaica Baehr & Baehr, 1993 – Thailand, Indonesia (Lombok, Sumbawa)
H. taita Foord & Dippenaar-Schoeman, 2006 – Kenya
H. taiwanensis Chen, 2007 – Taiwan
H. talebii Mirshamsi, Zamani & Marusik, 2016 – Iran
H. tamatavensis Foord & Dippenaar-Schoeman, 2006 – Madagascar
H. tenuifurcata Baehr & Baehr, 1998 – Australia (Western Australia)
H. thailandica Dankittipakul & Singtripop, 2011 – Thailand
H. tibialis Baehr & Baehr, 1993 – India, Sri Lanka
H. vanmoli Benoit, 1971 – Ivory Coast, Togo
H. vicina Baehr & Baehr, 1993 – Thailand
H. vinsoni Lucas, 1869 – Madagascar
H. wellswebberae Baehr & Baehr, 1998 – Australia (Northern Territory)
H. wraniki Rheims, Brescovit & van Harten, 2004 – Yemen (mainland, Socotra)
H. xieae Yin, 2012 – China
H. yaeyamaensis Tanikawa, 1999 – Japan
H. yunnanensis Wang, Song & Qiu, 1993 – China

References

External links
 Pictures of male and female Hersilia sp.

Araneomorphae genera
Hersiliidae
Spiders of Africa
Spiders of Asia
Spiders of Oceania
Taxa named by Jean Victoire Audouin